MarilynManson.com is the official website of American rock band Marilyn Manson. The website, since its launch in 1998, has been integral to the promotion and direction of the band. In the past, Marilyn Manson was known to launch hidden sites to promote select albums (Mechanical Animals and Holy Wood (In the Shadow of the Valley of Death) prominently), but promotion campaigns by this method have since been discontinued. Similarly, during the Celebritarian era of the band (following the release of Lest We Forget), a code that was thought to be hidden was discovered.

Much to fans' beliefs that this was intentionally meant to be found and deciphered, Marilyn Manson recently revealed in a 10-page exclusive interview with The Hierophant that the cause for alarm over the "hidden" code in the site was not his intention and it had evolved into something that he did not necessarily approve of. Manson also stated that his involvement in the Eat Me, Drink Me incarnation of the website launched on April 16, 2007 is very high, although it wasn't anything he would have said to create; he really liked the website and the creativity the designer brought to the table.

History of the website

Mechanical Animals era 

Marilyn Manson were one of the first bands to actively engage with their audience through online communication. Their first website was launched at 3pm PTD on September 4, 1998, and was created by ArtistDirect. This website contained numerous references to the numbers 1 and 5, similar to the artwork for the band's then-upcoming album, Mechanical Animals—which featured the band's name stylized as Mar1lyn Man5on. The album was also released on September 15. This website featured a bulletin board system, an interactive discography with lyrics and sound clips, photos, as well as an online store. The site also hosted regular contests, with a different fan being awarded two tickets for every North American date of the band's "Mechanical Animals Tour". On September 9, 1998, the band's eponymous singer took part in one of the world's first-ever live video chats, answering numerous questions submitted by fans.

The Mechanical Animals album brought with it the purchase of several domain names, including ComaWhite.com. These pages frequently contained secret embedded links which were used to navigate between each one. The album's plastic case featured a blue tinted front which, when held against specific sections of the liner notes and album art, revealed the domain names of these websites.

Holy Wood (In the Shadow of the Valley of Death) era 
Following the controversy surrounding the band after the Columbine High School massacre, band members retreated from the public eye, with Manson indicating that their website would be their "only contact with humanity" during the recording of their upcoming studio album, Holy Wood (In the Shadow of the Valley of Death). The band posted regular updates regarding the album's composition and recording. On December 15, 1999, a new intro was placed on the website, which featured Manson with a shaved head and the alchemical symbol for mercury painted on his forehead. On the same day, a webcast was launched, which announced the name of the album, its musical direction and a preview of several songs.

The following day, Manson posted another video, featuring clips of two previously unreleased songs. The first was a clip of the album's lead single, "Disposable Teens", while the second was a rough demo of a cover of Frankie Laine and Jimmy Boyd's 1953 single "The Little Boy and the Old Man" (composed by Wayne Shanklin a year earlier as "Little Child"; it was most popularly performed under the title "Mommy Dear" in the 1964 movie The Naked Kiss). As a Valentine's Day gift for fans, Manson posted a download of the band's cover of Charles Manson's "Sick City", from his 1970 album Lie: The Love and Terror Cult. The summer of 2000 saw an increased amount of activity from the band on their website. Over the course of a 3-week period in August and September, they posted weekly updates wherein the album's release date was announced, as well as a partial track listing. Sound files of "Burning Flag", "Cruci-Fiction in Space" and "The Love Song" were also released for free download, along with the cover of the Holy Wood novel.

The album's release on November 11, 2000 also saw their website host a series of competitions and giveaways. From November 1, the UK division of Interscope Records held a contest, with fans invited to log onto the website daily to pick up a series of coded clues which led to a hidden message. Fans who solved the riddle received an exclusive download, and were entered into a draw for a one-week trip for two to meet the band in Hollywood. On November 14, the band took a break from the Guns, God and Government Tour to perform a brief, four-song set at an intimate, invitation-only acoustic performance at the Saci nightclub in New York City, with tickets for the show given out for free via their website. Around the time of the release of the album's third single ("The Nobodies") in the UK, the website hosted yet another competition. The song's release had been timed to coincide with the band's appearance at the Reading Festival, and the winner of the competition was awarded two full-weekend passes to the festival, as well as unrestricted backstage access and a private sleeping area.

The Golden Age of Grotesque era 
The website of The Golden Age of Grotesque era featured most notably an extensive photo gallery and a journal kept by Manson, which he stopped updating shortly before the album release. The preface to the journal was a small vignette written by Marlene Dietrich. The website itself had many references to the 30s, including a new Manson logo (stylized to have an SS emblem-like look) and different photos of the era (including those of Go-Go Girls and Nazi parades) used in the design. Also notable is a section named The Oracle, which allowed fans to ask Marilyn Manson questions, with the most interesting of them being made public along with Manson's answers.

Lest We Forget era

Original website 
The new website was reminiscent of the Lest We Forget booklet design. The intro page featured a photo of Manson taken from the "(s)AINT" video, fading in and out to a music drone. It was on this page that the first codes appeared. The website also featured a small photo gallery consisting only of screenshots from the "Personal Jesus" video and Manson's journal from the previous website.

Intermission website 
On January 19, 2006, the website was replaced with a page containing a single image.  The image, apart from containing the Cross of Lorraine, had text similar to that of a statement from Justice Jackson during the Nuremberg trials which read:

On February 5, 2006, the image was changed to a Flash-based animation depicting two nude girls wearing masks and covered in blood. An image of a white rabbit in a cage was added to the animation on the following day.

On April 21, 2006, the animation was replaced by a rapid sequence of images including a cover of a newspaper about the Columbine high school massacre, a distorted still-frame of Marilyn Monroe singing "Diamonds Are a Girl's Best Friend" and a photo of Charles Manson's eyes.

On April 25, 2006, a second page became available on the website. It featured a small code sequence, completing which resulted in a small piece of music (which became known as the "Celebritarian Hymn") playing. The page also featured voice samples of Alfred Hitchcock, Albert Speer and a radio translation by Stuart Hibberd announcing Hitler's death. The page remained until the full launch of the new website on November 5, 2006.

After a lengthy period whereby fans attempted to decipher the codes, Marilyn Manson revealed that although he does not deny involvement, the codes developed into something he didn't necessarily approve of and should no longer be pursued.

Fully active launch 
On November 5, 2006, the full website was finally launched. Its sections were:
 Today's News — The news page.
 Performance — This page didn't exist at first; it was created after Marilyn Manson announced that he will be touring for Eat Me, Drink Me.
 Artworks — A page containing most of Marilyn Manson's paintings. The page featured an abstract image of Marilyn Manson's face, animations of some of his paintings and a small red bar containing the words "HOW DO I LOOK?" to the right. The page was also dubbed with audio of a woman's distorted voice saying, "How do I look?" repeatedly, and other audio samples.
 Gallery of Shapes — A page providing links to the following three pages:
 The Slideshow — A photo gallery containing screenshots from the "(s)AINT" and "Personal Jesus" videos.
 The Spectacle — This page was never launched
 The Style — A non-interactive version of the pre-launch page with the code sequence.
 Cinema — A page with the Flash animation depicting the two blood-covered girls, which had previously been seen on the phantasmagoria websites, and the official website earlier in the year.
 Synesthesia Archive — A full discography; the links to the different albums' pages were photos of Marilyn Manson stylized to look like Andy Warhol's Marilyn Monroe silkscreen prints.
 Prescriptions — A link to a shop with Marilyn Manson merchandise.

Celebritarian references included were:
 On the news page, the news articles that were not taken from external sources such as Rolling Stone but rather from the band itself were credited to "The Celebritarian Corporation".
 The Cross of Lorraine acted as a "back" button on all pages.
 The news page featured a short video of a John F. Kennedy speech interspersed with video from The Tonight Show.

Eat Me, Drink Me era 
On April 16, 2007, the website was again redeveloped and launched. The site featured imagery reminiscent of the themes expressed on the Eat Me, Drink Me album (no images of which are featured in the album's booklet). Manson has stated that his involvement in the Eat Me, Drink Me incarnation of the website launched on April 16, 2007, is very high. A new homepage was launched May 8, 2007.

The sections featured in this launch included:
 Home:
The initial homepage featured two bloodstain-like M's and links to all sections below.
The new homepage was created on May 8, 2007, and includes what appears to be a hallway of a hospital. A stretcher is carrying an amputated body that appears to be "put together" by a compilation of photographs attached to a string that carries up and off-screen. It is implied that the body on the stretcher belongs to the man seen in the News section, because both entities have hearts where their heads belong. On the wall can be found veins and muscles, "0550", a photograph of Manson, a clock without minute or hour hands, a painting of the rough "M M" found on the Eat Me, Drink Me album cover, and a wasp hive. Some objects found in this hallway scene link to the following sections when clicked.
 News — The news page; to the left could be found a body with a tag reading "3577" on its shirt, and an expanded heart where the head should be that leans back and forth. A swarm of bees would also constantly fly outward from a hole in the heart. Behind this body could be seen an odometer with translucent veins and muscles surrounding it. To the right of this imagery was a news section. A razor was used as a scroll bar, and when it was pointed down, the margins of the bar would leak blood. Also linked to by clicking the cadaver on the stretcher on the homepage.
 Tour Dates — A page which listed venues where Marilyn Manson would be performing on the upcoming tour to promote Eat Me, Drink Me, and links to their respective ticket providers. Also linked to by clicking the clock hanging on the wall on the homepage.
 Video Premiere — This page didn't exist at first; it was created on May 9, 2007, and features the music video for "Heart-Shaped Glasses (When the Heart Guides the Hand)" in its entirety. Also linked to by clicking the "V. Heart-Shaped Glasses (When the Heart Guides the Hand)" on the homepage.
 Art — A page containing most of Marilyn Manson's paintings. The page remained from the previous version of the website. Also linked to by clicking the eye in the hive in the hallway on the homepage.
 Booklet — This page didn't exist at first; it was created on May 18, 2007, and features all 16 pages of the booklet for Eat Me, Drink Me. Can only be linked to by clicking the cover of Eat Me, Drink Me on the homepage.

The High End of Low era 
On March 27, 2009, sections of the band's website were revised; the hospital scene on the homepage was replaced by a new photograph. In the image, Manson, dressed in army attire, is holding a wrapped American flag in his hands. Lying behind him seems to be a woman clad in lingerie, whom Manson mostly obstructs from the viewer. There are also words scrawled on the wall behind the two, which are animated by Adobe Flash Player.

The sections featured in this launch included:
 Download Exclusive Track – This linked to a page where visitors could register their e-mail address in return for a free download of "We're from America". On April 7, 2009, "We're from America" was made reissued as a digital download, and to coincide with this, the "Download Exclusive Track" link was removed from the band's website.
 MySpace – This links to Marilyn Manson's official MySpace profile.
 Tour Dates – A page which lists venues where Marilyn Manson will be performing on the upcoming tour to promote The High End of Low, and links to their respective ticket providers. This page remains unchanged from the Eat Me, Drink Me era.
 Art – This linked to the official website for Marilyn Manson's paintings. Three new pieces were added to its catalog to coincide with the relaunch of MarilynManson.com.
 When the website was updated on April 15, 2009, the Art link was altered to "Art Store".
 Merchandise – This links to an online retailer selling Marilyn Manson merchandise.
 Art Gallery – This didn't exist at first. It links to a page containing most of Marilyn Manson's paintings, including two new pieces which were previously seen at Manson's Miami exhibition in December 2008. This page remained from two previous versions of the website.
Track Listing:  The website has now confirmed the 15 tracks on the album 

Sometime after the release of The High End of Low, a flash animation replaced the previous website which features Marilyn Manson with a blue face, a woman covering up her breasts and a fuzzy TV screen. The animation is accompanied by an audio track that has parts of a fictional advertisement for a dual-bladed saw, children laughing hysterically, some strange voices, and speech in an indecipherable language that may be spoken by Manson himself.

Sister websites 
During the Mechanical Animals and Holy Wood (In the Shadow of the Valley of Death) eras, additional websites were launched. The following links provided to these sites are archived sites taken from Nachtkabarett, a critical Marilyn Manson fansite.

ComaWhite.com 
ComaWhite.com, found through the Mechanical Animals album booklet, consisted of a chart, which can also be seen in the inlay of the Mechanical Animals album, and by clicking on various cells of chart certain images were revealed. One of the images linked to the official Marilyn Manson message board.

TheLambOfGod.com 
Launched in the summer of 2000, the website acted as a prelude to the album Holy Wood (In the Shadow of the Valley of Death), with one of the updates adding an image of Kern Gate and a message by Manson stating the band is in Death Valley and writing a new album.

TheLoveSong.com 
A website containing a preview of the identically named song from Holy Wood (In the Shadow of the Valley of Death). The image displayed on the website was the cover of the book "Holy Wood", which was planned to be released along with the album, but as of 2007 remains currently unreleased.

Cruci-FictionInSpace.com 
A website containing a preview of the identically named song from Holy Wood (In the Shadow of the Valley of Death) and also featuring a single image displaying the process of evolution from a monkey to a man, depicting the song's theme.

YourBurningFlag.com 
A website containing a preview of the identically named song from Holy Wood (In the Shadow of the Valley of Death). The single image displayed on the website was that of a senate press conference concerning violence in entertainment, which was held shortly after the Columbine High School Massacre, for inspiring which Manson was blamed. The image depicts senators Joe Lieberman and Orrin Hatch, the latter of which is holding Marilyn Manson's Antichrist Superstar album.

TheDeathSong.com 
A website containing a preview of the identically named song from Holy Wood (In the Shadow of the Valley of Death). The image displayed on the website is that of a cemetery, echoing the song's theme.

ThisAsValentinesDay.com 
Found through a post made by Manson on the official BBS on February 14, 2001, named "They'd Remember 'This As Valentine's Day'". The website contains an image of the Time magazine dated February 14, 1964, which had Marina Oswald featured on the cover. By clicking on her brooch, Chapter 10 of the novel Holy Wood (meant to be released along with the album) is displayed. Also, by clicking on the date on the magazine, the user is redirected to ComaWhite.com.

Celebritarian.com 
The original version of the website contained an extensive questionnaire and a video intro featuring photos of famous deceased political leaders. The song playing in the background is "I'm Leaving it Up To You" by Daly and Grace (the song was the number one song on November 22, 1963, the day John F. Kennedy was assassinated). After the Lest We Forget release, the website was replaced with a single image of the Lorraine cross, which linked to the official Manson website. Currently, it redirects to the official Manson website.

MarilynMansonVault.com 
On May 22, 2007, this official Eat Me, Drink Me was discovered through a link found in the Europe "Heart-Shaped Glasses (When the Heart Guides the Hand)" single. The site contains lyrics, an art gallery, a mosaic, and the ability to stream up to two tracks per day starting on May 28, 2007. Upon completion of the mosaic, an Eat Me, Drink Me wallpaper becomes available for download, and three preview tracks ("Heart-Shaped Glasses (When the Heart Guides the Hand)", "If I Was Your Vampire", and "Evidence") become available for streaming.

Registered, but unused domain names 
Several domain names were registered throughout Manson's career, possibly with the intent of creating additional "sister sites", but were never used.

Holy Wood (In the Shadow of the Valley of Death) era

The Golden Age of Grotesque era

Flashcards 
From 1999 to 2003 Marilyn Manson released 6 flashcards, which featured mostly drawn imagery (with the exception of the "Mobscene" flashcard) and small parts of songs. Flashcards released were:

 "The Last Tour on Earth" promotion flashcard, featuring a song preview of "Astonishing Panorama of the Endtimes".
 "The Love Song" flashcard, featuring rapidly interchanging photos.
 "Cruci-Fiction in Space" flashcard, featuring images of monkeys, an image of a gun and an image of a human skull, portraying the main theme of the song.
 "Burning Flag" flashcard, featuring images of the American Flag and those of soldiers during the World War II.
 "Godeatgod" flashcard, featuring religious images.
 "Disposable Teens" flashcard, featuring the single cover, images of the John F. Kennedy autopsy and stills from the video for the song.
 "The Fight Song" flashcard, featuring the cover image and chapter index design taken from Manson's autobiography, The Long Hard Road Out of Hell.
 "The Nobodies" flashcard, featuring band shots and different occult images.
 "Mobscene" flashcard, featuring band shots and stills from the music video.

References

External links 
Official Marilyn Manson website
Marilyn Manson analysis, including info about the website

1998 establishments in the United States
American music websites
Internet properties established in 1998
Marilyn Manson (band)